The Malawi bushbaby (Paragalago nyasae) is a species of primate in the family Galagidae. It lives in southern Malawi and the neighboring region in Mozambique. The IUCN considers it to be part of the species Paragalago granti, Grant's bushbaby.

References

Malawi bushbaby
Mammals of Malawi
Mammals of Mozambique
Malawi bushbaby
Taxobox binomials not recognized by IUCN